Christian Styren (born 31 January 1965) is a Norwegian diver. He was born in Oslo. He competed at the 1992 Summer Olympics in Barcelona. He won thirteen gold medals in diving at the Norwegian championships.

References

External links 
 

1965 births
Living people
Sportspeople from Oslo
Norwegian male divers
Olympic divers of Norway
Divers at the 1992 Summer Olympics